These hits topped the Ultratop 50 started the official charts.

See also
1995 in music

References

1995 in Belgium
1995 record charts
1995